Glyphodes bicoloralis is a moth in the family Crambidae. It was described by Strand in 1912. It is found in Cameroon, the Republic of Congo, the Democratic Republic of Congo and Ghana.

References

Moths described in 1912
Glyphodes